Satanica or La Satánica may refer to:

Books
La Satanica (ラ・サタニカ), Japanese manga
Satanica, art magazine by Christeene Vale and others 2012

Film and TV
Rapsodia satanica, 1915 silent film directed by Nino Oxilia featuring Lyda Borelli in a female version of Faust, music by Pietro Mascagni
La Satánica, 1973 film directed by Alfredo B. Crevenna  
La Satánica, 1971 Mexican telenovela also featuring Raúl Ramírez
Satanica, wrestling move used by Shuu Shibutani

Music
Satanica (album), 1999 album by Behemoth
"Diva Satanica", 2009 song by Arch Enemy from Burning Bridges

Plants
Solidago satanica, the devil's goldenrod, is a rare North American plant species in the sunflower family

Insects
Melanodexia satanica, a fly in the genus Melanodexia